Dog Head 218 is an Indian reserve of the Mikisew Cree First Nation in Alberta, located within the Regional Municipality of Wood Buffalo. In the 2016 Canadian Census, it recorded a population of 99 living in 39 of its 49 total private dwellings.

References

Regional Municipality of Wood Buffalo
Indian reserves in Alberta
Lake Athabasca